Latin Classics - Mijares is the sixth compilation album by Mexican pop singer Mijares. It is part of an EMI International series, all with similar artwork featuring compilations of artists included Jon Secada, Los Mismos, Alvaro Torres, Los Alegres de Terán, Mazz, Emilio Navaira, Grupo Modelo, Baron de Apodaca, Jose Luis Perales, Ednita Nazario, Daniela Romo, Barrio Boyzz, Paulina Rubio, Paloma San Basilio, La Tropa F, Pandora (musical group),  Los Donneños, Myriam Hernandez, Jose Feliciano, La Mafia, Luis Miguel, Laura Canales and Ram Herrera.

Track listing
Tracks[]:
 María bonita
 No se murió el amor
 La quiero a morir
 Para amarnos más
 Soldado del amor
 Alfonsina y el mar
 Que nada nos separe
 Piel canela
 Bonita
 El breve espacio

2003 greatest hits albums
Manuel Mijares compilation albums